Attala is a village in Tolna County, Hungary.

Etymology
According to the local legends the name comes from the name of the mistress of Sülledvár. Her name could be Atala. She committed blasphemy as the legend says and her castle sank into the ground. There was indeed a castle during the Roman times.

The accepted theory states that the name could came from the person name Attila.

History
According to László Szita the settlement was completely Hungarian in the 18th century.

References

External links 
 Street map 

Populated places in Tolna County